Jacco Eltingh and Paul Haarhuis were the defending champions, but lost in the quarterfinals this year.

Grant Connell and Patrick Galbraith won in the final 6–2, 6–2, against Jim Grabb and Todd Martin.

Seeds
All seeds receive a bye into the second round.

Draw

Finals

Top half

Bottom half

External links
 1995 Paris Open Doubles draw

Doubles
1995 ATP Tour